Belemnia mygdon is a moth of the subfamily Arctiinae. It was described by Herbert Druce in 1900. It is found in Colombia.

Subspecies
Belemnia mygdon mygdon
Belemnia mygdon marthae Rothschild, 1909

References

Arctiini
Moths described in 1900